Hipler is a German surname. Notable people with the surname include:

 Elke Hipler (born 1978), German rower
 Wendel Hipler (1465-1526), nobleman in Franconia and supporter of the local peasant revolt

See also
 Hippler

German-language surnames